The 86th Infantry Division, also known as the Blackhawk Division, was a unit of the United States Army in World War I and World War II.
Currently called the  86th Training Division, based at Fort McCoy, Wisconsin, members of the division now work with Active Army, Reserve, and National Guard units to provide them with a Decisive Action Training Environment on a yearly basis.

World War I
The division saw no combat in World War I. The division was originally organized on 25 August 1917 at Camp Grant in Rockford, Illinois. A small cadre of Regular Army, in addition to Officers Reserve Corps and National Army officers staffed the division, while the soldiers were predominantly Selective Service men drawn from the states of Illinois and Wisconsin. It went overseas in August 1918, and was ordered to be skeletonized in October, with its personnel transferred to other units. It returned to the United States in November 1918, and was deactivated in January 1919.

Order of battle

 Headquarters, 86th Division
 171st Infantry Brigade
 341st Infantry Regiment
 342nd Infantry Regiment
 332nd Machine Gun Battalion
 172nd Infantry Brigade
 343rd Infantry Regiment
 344th Infantry Regiment
 333rd Machine Gun Battalion
 161st Field Artillery Brigade
 331st Field Artillery Regiment (75 mm)
 332nd Field Artillery Regiment (75 mm)
 333rd Field Artillery Regiment (155 mm) 
 311th Trench Mortar Battery
 Headquarters Troop, 86th Division
 331st Machine Gun Battalion
 311th Engineer Regiment
 311th Field Signal Battalion
 311th Train Headquarters and Military Police
 311th Ammunition Train
 311th Supply Train
 311th Engineer Train
 311th Sanitary Train
 341st, 342nd, 343rd, and 344th Ambulance Companies and Field Hospitals

Commanders
 Maj. Gen. Thomas H. Barry (25 August 1917)
 Brig. Gen. Lyman W.V. Kennon (26 November 1917)
 Maj. Gen. Thomas H. Barry (15 February 1918)
 Brig. Gen. Lyman W.V. Kennon (21 March 1918)
 Maj. Gen. Charles Henry Martin (18 April 1918)
 Brig. Gen. Lincoln Clark Andrews (19 October 1918)
 Maj. Gen. Charles Clarendon Ballou (19 November 1918)

Interwar period

The division was reconstituted in the Organized Reserve on 24 June 1921 and assigned to the state of Illinois. The headquarters was organized on 10 September 1921.

World War II
Ordered into active military service: 15 December 1942 at Camp Howze, Texas. 
Overseas: 19 February 1945, for the ETO; 24 August 1945, for the Pacific
Campaigns: Central Europe
Days of combat: 34
Awards: DSC-2 ; DSM-1 ; SS-12 ; LM-1; SM-1 ; BSM282 ; AM-2
Commanders: Maj. Gen. Alexander E. Anderson (December 1942), Maj. Gen. Harris M. Melasky (4 January 1943 – December 1945), Maj. Gen. Paul J. Mueller (January 1946 – April 1946), Maj. Gen. Herman F. Kramer (April 1946 – July 1946), Maj. Gen. Harry F. Hazlett (July 1946 to inactivation)
Returned to U.S.: 17 June 1945, from the ETO, "the first combat division to return from the European theater."
Overseas: 24 August 1945
Deactivated: 30 December 1946 on Leyte, Philippine Islands

Order of battle

 Headquarters, 86th Infantry Division
 341st Infantry Regiment
 342d Infantry Regiment
 343d Infantry Regiment
 86th Infantry Division Artillery
 Headquarters and Headquarters Battery
 331st Field Artillery Battalion (105 mm)
 332d Field Artillery Battalion (105 mm)
 404th Field Artillery Battalion (155 mm)
 911th Field Artillery Battalion (105 mm)
 311th Engineer Combat Battalion
 311th Medical Battalion
 86th Cavalry Reconnaissance Troop (Mechanized)
 Headquarters, Special Troops, 86th Infantry Division
 Headquarters Company, 86th Infantry Division
 786th Ordnance Light Maintenance Company
 86th Quartermaster Company
 86th Signal Company
 Military Police Platoon
 Band
 86th Counterintelligence Corps Detachment

Combat chronicle
In early January 1945, General Dwight D. Eisenhower was alarmed over the swift progress the Germans had made during the waning Battle of the Bulge and was concerned that the Germans could move additional reinforcements to the west from the Eastern Front. He requested additional divisions over and above those already earmarked for the European theater. The 86th and 97th Infantry Divisions, allocated for service in the Pacific, were ordered to the European Theater of Operations instead for the final assault on Germany. The division arrived in France, 4 March 1945, and moved to Cologne, Germany, taking over defensive positions near Weiden, 24 March, in relief of the 8th Infantry Division. After a short period of patrolling on both sides of the Rhine, the division was relieved, and moved across the Rhine to Eibelshausen, Germany, 5 April. In a rapid offensive advance, the 86th moved across the Bigge River, cleared Attendorn, 11 April, and continued on to the Ruhr uniting with the Ninth Army, taking part in the Ruhr pocket fighting. On 21 April, the division moved to Ansbach and continued to advance, taking Eichstätt on the 25th, crossing the Danube at Ingolstadt on the 27th, securing the bridge over the Amper Canal, 29 April, crossing the Isar and reaching Mittel Isar Canal by the end of the month. The division was ordered to take Wasserburg, 1 May, and leading elements had reached the outskirts of the city when they were ordered to withdraw, 2 May, and to move east to Salzburg.

On 4 May, the division captured the crown jewels of Hungary in Mattsee, Austria. At the end of the war, the division was securing the left flank of the XV Corps. After processing German prisoners of war, it was redeployed to the United States, the 14,289 officers and men arriving in New York aboard four Navy transports 17 June 1945. The division trained briefly at Camp Gruber, Oklahoma, 21 June – 11 August 1945; and then left San Francisco, 24 August 1945, for the Philippines. The 86th Division was aboard ship in Leyte harbor when the Japanese surrendered. After landing on Luzon the unit was dispersed throughout the Island, some to Marikina, some to other locations. A few were assigned to Corregidor Island to guard Japanese prisoners of war. While Japan formally had surrendered on 2 September 1945, division soldiers still sometimes had to face Japanese soldiers who had refused to surrender as well as Huks (Hukbalahap guerrillas). According to one account, as late as October 1946 the "straggler menace was still there" as 77 Japanese prisoners were captured. A division officer (Lt. Col. A. L. Hugins) also "was fired on while in convoy near Angeles" in the same month.

Casualties
Total battle casualties: 785
Killed in action: 136
Wounded in action: 615
Missing in action: 12
Prisoner of war: 19

Assignments in ETO
30 January 1945: Fifteenth Army, 12th Army Group.
22 March 1945: VII Corps, First Army, 12th Army Group.
30 March 1945: XXII Corps, Fifteenth Army, 12th Army Group.
5 April 1945: XVIII (Abn) Corps, First Army, 12th Army Group.
19 April 1945: Third Army, 12th Army Group.
22 April 1945: III Corps.
2 May 1945: XV Corps, Seventh Army, 6th Army Group.

Nickname and legacy
The division was nicknamed the "Black Hawk Division" after the Sauk Chief Black Hawk. Frederic McLaughlin was a commander with the 333rd Machine Gun Battalion of the 86th Infantry Division during World War I.  In 1926, McLaughlin was granted a franchise by the National Hockey League, which he named the Chicago Blackhawks after his wartime unit.

Present day
The 86th was redesignated HQ 86th Training Brigade on 11 Feb 2009 and activated at Fort McCoy, Wisconsin on 16 September 2010. Shortly after its reactivation, on 18 September 2010, it was redesignated as Headquarters 86th Training Division.

Subordinate units 

As of 2019 the following units are subordinated to the 86th Training Division (Decisive Action):

 1st Brigade
 1st Battalion, 329th Regiment
 3d Battalion, 346th Regiment
 2d Battalion 383d Regiment
 3d Battalion, 397th Regiment

Notable members
 Edwin Hubble served in 2d Battalion, 343d Infantry Regiment as a major during World War I.
 Frederic McLaughlin, served in the division in World War I. 
 Al Neuharth served in the division in World War II.

References

Sources
 The Official History of the Eighty-Six Division 1921
The Army Almanac: A Book of Facts Concerning the Army of the United States U.S. Government Printing Office, 1950

Infantry divisions of the United States Army
Infantry Division, U.S. 086
Military units and formations established in 1917
United States Army divisions of World War I
History of the Chicago Blackhawks
Training divisions of the United States Army
Infantry divisions of the United States Army in World War II